The 1966 Wightman Cup was the 38th edition of the annual women's team tennis competition between the United States and Great Britain. It was held at the All England Lawn Tennis and Croquet Club in London in England in the United Kingdom.

References

1966
1966 in tennis
1966 in American tennis
1966 in British sport
1966 in women's tennis
1966 sports events in London
1966 in English tennis
1966 in English women's sport